Stoner TV is a subgenre of television programming that revolves around the use of marijuana.  Typically, such TV show cannabis use in a comic and positive fashion. Cannabis use is one of the themes and is used on screen by the characters.

References

Literature
 (see chapters Must-See Stoner TV and A Brief History of Classic Stoner TV (p. 170 - 174))

Television genres
Cannabis media